American Pie Presents is a spin-off film series of the American Pie franchise. The series consists of five films: American Pie Presents: Band Camp (2005), American Pie Presents: The Naked Mile (2006), American Pie Presents: Beta House (2007), American Pie Presents: The Book of Love (2009), and American Pie Presents: Girls' Rules (2020), all of which went direct-to-video. Noah Levenstein (Eugene Levy), a character in the original series, appears in all films (with the exception of Girls' Rules).

Films

Band Camp (2005)

Matt Stifler wants to be just like his big brother, making porn movies and having a good time in college. After sabotaging the school band, he gets sent to band camp where he really does not like it at first but then learns how to deal with the people there.

The Naked Mile (2006)

When Erik Stifler gets a free pass to do whatever he wants from his girlfriend, he and his two best friends, Ryan and Cooze, head to see his cousin Dwight for the Naked Mile and a weekend they will never forget.

Beta House (2007)

Erik and Cooze start college and pledge the Beta House fraternity, presided over by none other than legendary Dwight Stifler. But chaos ensues when a fraternity of geeks threatens to stop the debauchery and the Betas have to make a stand for their right to party.

The Book of Love (2009)

Three new hapless virgins discover the "Bible" (a sex manual) hidden in the school library at East Great Falls High. Unfortunately for them, the book is ruined, and with incomplete advice, the Bible leads them on a journey to lose their virginity.

Girls' Rules (2020)

It's senior year at East Great Falls. Annie, Kayla, Michelle, and Stephanie decide to harness their girl power and band together to get what they want their last year of high school.

Cast
A dark gray cell indicates the character was not in the film.

Crew

References

External links

Universal Pictures franchises
Film series introduced in 2005
Film spin-offs
American film series
American Pie (film series)